The Dutch government-in-exile, also known as the London Cabinet, was the government in exile of the Netherlands, supervised by Queen Wilhelmina, that fled to London after the German invasion of the country during World War II on 10 May 1940.

Background and exile

Until 1940, the Netherlands was a neutral country that was generally on good terms with Germany. On 10 May 1940, Germany invaded the Netherlands. Queen Wilhelmina fled the country aboard the British destroyer HMS Hereward, arriving in London on 13 May. The Dutch armed forces surrendered two days later as they had been unable to withstand the speed of Germany's blitzkrieg style attack. In London, the queen took charge of the Dutch government-in-exile, which was established at Stratton House in the Piccadilly area of London, opposite Green Park. Initially, their hope was that France would regroup and liberate the country. Although there was such an attempt, it soon failed, and the Allied forces were surrounded and forced to evacuate at Dunkirk. The Dutch armed forces in the Netherlands except for those occupying Zeeland surrendered on 15 May 1940. 

To safeguard the succession, the heir to the throne, Princess Juliana, along with her family, was sent farther away to Canada, where they spent the war.

The government-in-exile was soon faced with a dilemma. After France had been defeated, the Vichy French government came to power and proposed to Adolf Hitler a policy of collaboration. That led to a conflict between Prime Minister Dirk Jan de Geer and the Queen. De Geer wanted to return to the Netherlands and collaborate as well. The government-in-exile was still in control of the Dutch East Indies with all its resources and was the third-largest oil producer in the world, after the United States and the Soviet Union. Wilhelmina realized that if the Dutch collaborated with Germany, the Dutch East Indies would be surrendered to Japan, as French Indochina was surrendered later by orders of the Vichy government.

Exile in London

As the hope for liberation was now the entry of the Americans or the Soviet Union into the war, the Queen dismissed De Geer as prime minister. She replaced him with Pieter Sjoerds Gerbrandy, who worked with Churchill and Roosevelt on ways to smooth the path for an American entry. Aruba and Curaçao, with world-class exporting oil refineries, were important suppliers of refined products to the Allies. Aruba became a British protectorate from 1940 to 1942 and a US protectorate from 1942 to 1945. On 23 November 1941, under an agreement with the Dutch government-in-exile, the United States occupied Dutch Guiana to protect the bauxite mines. An oil boycott was imposed on Japan, which helped to spark the Pearl Harbor attack.

In September 1944, the Dutch, Belgian and the Luxembourgish governments in exile began formulating an agreement over the creation of a Benelux Customs Union. The agreement was signed in the London Customs Convention on 5 September 1944.

The Queen's unusual action was later ratified by the States General of the Netherlands in 1946. Churchill called her "the only man in the Dutch government". After World War II ended, Wilhelmina and her government returned from exile to re-establish a regime more democratic than ever before.

See also
 Binnenlandse Strijdkrachten
 Dutch resistance
 Netherlands in World War II
 Netherlands Indies Civil Administration, established in 1944
 Operation Neuland
 Radio Oranje
 Reichskommissariat Niederlande

References

Netherlands in World War II
Governments in exile during World War II
Former governments in exile
1940 establishments in England
1945 disestablishments in England
Netherlands–United Kingdom relations
G
G
Wilhelmina of the Netherlands
1940s in the City of Westminster